Arunkhola is a town situated on the bank of the river Arun (formerly Arung, named after its source in Palpa) before as  Naya Belhani VDC  Ward No. 8 of Nawalparasi, but now as Madhyabindu Municipality, ward no. 10, Nawalpur District of Western Nepal. It is also known as Aarungkhola, Aarunkhola() and Bhagra (old-fashioned name). It is an emerging business hub of the district.

The east-to-west Mahendra Highway passes through the Arunkhola bazaar, and is 197 km southwest of the capital city Kathmandu. Even though it covers  about 100 km of the Naya Belhani VDC, it is densely populated.

Commerce
Arunkhola lies between Butwal (63 km) and Narayan Ghat (52 km), two major cities of Nepal. It is a major market for Eastern Palpa. Arunkhola is not that far from India either, a 3 hours walk to Triveni, a border town. It has a potential of becoming a major business hub in the area.

While a large number of people in Arunkhola rely on business, its economy is still mainly based on agriculture, service and trade. There are big markets all around Arunkhola. There is also a big community of ex-servicemen of the British and Indian Army, an ex-service men colony in the south of Arunkhola. Arunkhola is about 3 km north of Narayani river and Charkoshe Jhhadi - the largest forest of Nepal and the home of wild animals such as Rhinos, Tigers, etc. 
There are five 'A' level banks and some small co-operatives in operation. The villages around Arunkhola are Bhiuran, Kusunde, Tamaspur, Belhani, Khayarsal, Karamghari and Charikun. Arunkhola being a relatively new town, it is possible to see people from almost all parts of Nepal in Arunkhola.

Population
According to the 2011 Census 4265 people lives in 1028 households. This includes 1926 males and 2339 females.

Schools 
 Shree Janata Higher Secondary School (public)
 Shree Janata Secondary School (public)
 Shree Aarungkhola Secondary Boarding School (private) 
 Shree Narayani Boarding School (private) 
 Shree Shantideep Boarding School( private)
 Little Step Academy (private) 
 Nepal Open University

HEALTH
 Manu Hospital
Mini Princeton Hospital
Nepal Public Hospital
City Hospital
Arunkhola Medical College
WHO INTL. Medical College
Bishow Pharmecy

Gallery

References 

Populated places in Nawalpur District